Checks Thugs and Rock n Roll is the debut solo studio album by American musician Darryl "D.M.C." McDaniels from hip hop group Run-DMC. It was released on March 14, 2006, through Romen Mpire/Rags 2 Riches Records. He was inspired to put out this album when, at age 35, he found out he was adopted.

Track listing

Personnel
Drums: Joey Kramer, Ashwin Sood
Drum Programming: Romeo Antonio
Bass: Tom Hamilton, Romeo Antonio
Guitars: Romeo Antonio, Elliot Easton, Billy Roues
Keyboards: Romeo Antonio
Multi-Instruments: Kid Rock, Romeo Antonio 
DJ: Kid Rock
Vocals: Sonny Black, Gary Dourdan, Doug E. Fresh, Kid Rock
Programming: Shatek King
Orchestration, Conducting: Romeo Antonio
Violin: Anna Stafford
Executive Producers: Romeo Antonio, DMC, Erik Blam
Producers: Romeo Antonio, DMC, Kid Rock, DJ Lethal, Shatek King
Engineer: Romeo Antonio, Jam Master Jay
Mixing: Romeo Antonio, Jean-Marie Horvat, Paul McKenna, Ron Saint Germain, Ashwin Sood
Mastering: Nancy Matter

Charts

References

External links

2006 debut albums
Darryl McDaniels albums
Albums produced by Kid Rock
Albums produced by DJ Lethal
Albums produced by Darryl McDaniels